A dune is a landform composed of wind- or water-driven sand. It typically takes the form of a mound, ridge, or hill. An area with dunes is called a dune system or a dune complex.  A large dune complex is called a dune field, while broad, flat regions covered with wind-swept sand or dunes with little or no vegetation are called ergs or sand seas. Dunes occur in different shapes and sizes, but most kinds of dunes are longer on the stoss (upflow) side, where the sand is pushed up the dune, and have a shorter slip face in the lee side. The valley or trough between dunes is called a dune slack.

Dunes are most common in desert environments, where the lack of moisture hinders the growth of vegetation that would otherwise interfere with the  development of dunes. However, sand deposits are not restricted to deserts, and dunes are also found along sea shores, along streams in semiarid climates, in areas of glacial outwash, and in other areas where poorly cemented sandstone bedrock disintegrates to produce an ample supply of loose sand.  Subaqueous dunes can form from the action of water flow (fluvial processes) on sand or gravel beds of rivers, estuaries, and the sea-bed.

Some coastal areas have one or more sets of dunes running parallel to the shoreline directly inland from the beach. In most cases, the dunes are important in protecting the land against potential ravages by storm waves from the sea. Artificial dunes are sometimes constructed to protect coastal areas.  The dynamic action of wind and water can sometimes cause dunes to drift, which can have serious consequences. For example, the town of Eucla, Western Australia, had to be relocated in the 1890s because of dune drift.

The modern word "dune" came into English from French around 1790, which in turn came from Middle Dutch dūne.

Formation

A universally precise distinction does not exist between ripples, dunes, and a draa, which are all deposits of the same type of materials.  Dunes are generally defined as greater than 7 cm tall and may have ripples, while ripples are deposits that are less than 3 cm tall.  A draa is a very large eolian landform, with a length of several kilometers and a height of tens to hundreds of meters, and which may have superimposed dunes.

Dunes are made of sand-sized particles, and may consist of quartz, calcium carbonate, snow, gypsum, or other materials. The upwind/upstream/upcurrent side of the dune is called the stoss side; the downflow side is called the lee side. Sand is pushed (creep) or bounces (saltation) up the stoss side, and slides down the lee side. A side of a dune that the sand has slid down is called a slip face (or slipface).

The Bagnold formula gives the speed at which particles can be transported.

Aeolian dunes

Aeolian dune shapes
Five basic dune types are recognized: crescentic, linear, star, dome, and parabolic. Dune areas may occur in three forms: simple (isolated dunes of basic type), compound (larger dunes on which smaller dunes of same type form), and complex (combinations of different types).

Barchan or crescentic

Barchan dunes are crescent-shaped mounds which are generally wider than they are long. The lee-side slipfaces are on the concave sides of the dunes. These dunes form under winds that blow consistently from one direction (unimodal
winds). They form separate crescents when the sand supply is comparatively small. When the sand supply is greater, they may merge into barchanoid ridges, and then transverse dunes (see below).

Some types of crescentic dunes move more quickly over desert surfaces than any other type of dune. A group of dunes moved more than 100 metres per year between 1954 and 1959 in China's Ningxia Province, and similar speeds have been recorded in the Western Desert of Egypt. The largest crescentic dunes on Earth, with mean crest-to-crest widths of more than three kilometres, are in China's Taklamakan Desert.

See lunettes and parabolic dunes, below, for dunes similar to crescent-shaped ones.

Transverse dunes
Abundant barchan dunes may merge into barchanoid ridges, which then grade into linear (or slightly sinuous) transverse dunes, so called because they lie transverse, or across, the wind direction, with the wind blowing perpendicular to the ridge crest.

Seif or longitudinal dunes

Seif dunes are linear (or slightly sinuous) dunes with two slip faces. The two slip faces make them sharp-crested. They are called seif dunes after the Arabic word for "sword". They may be more than 160 kilometres (100 miles) long, and thus easily visible in satellite images (see illustrations).

Seif dunes are associated with bidirectional winds. The long axes and ridges of these dunes extend along the resultant direction of sand movement (hence the name "longitudinal"). Some linear dunes merge to form Y-shaped compound dunes.

Formation is debated. Ralph Bagnold, in The Physics of Blown Sand and Desert Dunes, suggested that some seif dunes form when a barchan dune moves into a bidirectional wind regime, and one arm or wing of the crescent elongates. Others suggest that seif dunes are formed by vortices in a unidirectional wind. In the sheltered troughs between highly developed seif dunes, barchans may be formed, because the wind is constrained to be unidirectional by the dunes.

 

Seif dunes are common in the Sahara.

Linear loess hills known as pahas are superficially similar. These hills appear to have been formed during the last ice age under permafrost conditions dominated by sparse tundra vegetation.

Star
Radially symmetrical, star dunes are pyramidal sand mounds with slipfaces on three or more arms that radiate from the high center of the mound. They tend to accumulate in areas with multidirectional wind regimes. Star dunes grow upward rather than laterally. They dominate the Grand Erg Oriental of the Sahara. In other deserts, they occur around the margins of the sand seas, particularly near topographic barriers. In the southeast Badain Jaran Desert of China, the star dunes are up to 500 metres tall and may be the tallest dunes on Earth.

Dome
Oval or circular mounds that generally lack a slipface. Dome dunes are rare and occur at the far upwind margins of sand seas.

Lunettes
Fixed crescentic dunes that form on the leeward margins of playas and river valleys in arid and semiarid regions in response to the direction (s) of prevailing winds, are known as lunettes, source-bordering dunes, bourrelets and clay dunes. They may be composed of clay, silt, sand, or gypsum, eroded from the basin floor or shore, transported up the concave side of the dune, and deposited on the convex side. Examples in Australia are up to 6.5 km long, 1 km wide, and up to 50 metres high. They also occur in southern and West Africa, and in parts of the western United States, especially Texas.

Parabolic

U-shaped mounds of sand with convex noses trailed by elongated arms are parabolic dunes. These dunes are formed from blowout dunes where the erosion of vegetated sand leads to a U-shaped depression. The elongated arms are held in place by vegetation; the largest arm known on Earth reaches 12 km. Sometimes these dunes are called U-shaped, blowout, or hairpin dunes, and they are well known in coastal deserts. Unlike crescent shaped dunes, their crests point upwind. The bulk of the sand in the dune migrates forward.

In plan view, these are U-shaped or V-shaped mounds of well-sorted, very fine to medium sand with elongated arms that extend upwind behind the central part of the dune. There are slipfaces that often occur on the outer side of the nose and on the outer slopes of the arms.

These dunes often occur in semiarid areas where the precipitation is retained in the lower parts of the dune and underlying soils. The stability of the dunes was once attributed to the vegetative cover but recent research has pointed to water as the main source of parabolic dune stability. The vegetation that covers them—grasses, shrubs, and trees—help anchor the trailing arms. In inland deserts, parabolic dunes commonly originate and extend downwind from blowouts in sand sheets only partly anchored by vegetation. They can also originate from beach sands and extend inland into vegetated areas in coastal zones and on shores of large lakes.

Most parabolic dunes do not reach heights higher than a few tens of metres except at their nose, where vegetation stops or slows the advance of accumulating sand.

Simple parabolic dunes have only one set of arms that trail upwind, behind the leading nose. Compound parabolic dunes are coalesced features with several sets of trailing arms. Complex parabolic dunes include subsidiary superposed or coalesced forms, usually of barchanoid or linear shapes.

Parabolic dunes, like crescent dunes, occur in areas where very strong winds are mostly unidirectional. Although these dunes are found in areas now characterized by variable wind speeds, the effective winds associated with the growth and migration of both the parabolic and crescent dunes probably are the most consistent in wind direction.

The grain size for these well-sorted, very fine to medium sands is about 0.06 to 0.5 mm. Parabolic dunes have loose sand and steep slopes only on their outer flanks. The inner slopes are mostly well packed and anchored by vegetation, as are the corridors between individual dunes. Because all dune arms are oriented in the same direction, and, the inter-dune corridors are generally swept clear of loose sand, the corridors can usually be traversed in between the trailing arms of the dune. However to cross straight over the dune by going over the trailing arms, can be very difficult. Also, traversing the nose is very difficult as well because the nose is usually made up of loose sand without much if any vegetation.

A type of extensive parabolic dune that lacks discernible slipfaces and has mostly coarse grained sand is known as a zibar. The term zibar comes from the Arabic word to describe "rolling transverse ridges ... with a hard surface". The dunes are small, have low relief, and can be found in many places across the planet from Wyoming (United States) to Saudi Arabia to Australia. Spacing between zibars ranges from 50 to 400 metres and they don't become more than 10 metres high. The dunes form at about ninety degrees to the prevailing wind which blows away the small, fine-grained sand leaving behind the coarser grained sand to form the crest.

Reversing dunes

Occurring wherever winds periodically reverse direction, reversing dunes are varieties of any of the above shapes. These dunes typically have major and minor slipfaces oriented in opposite directions. The minor slipfaces are usually temporary, as they appear after a reverse wind and are generally destroyed when the wind next blows in the dominant direction.

Draas

Draas are very large-scale dune bedforms; they may be tens or a few hundreds of metres in height, kilometres wide, and hundreds of kilometres in length. After a draa has reached a certain size, it generally develops superimposed dune forms. They are thought to be more ancient and slower-moving than smaller dunes, and to form by vertical growth of existing dunes. Draas are widespread in sand seas and are well-represented in the geological record.

Dune complexity
All these dune shapes may occur in three forms: simple (isolated dunes of basic type), compound (larger dunes on which smaller dunes of same type form), and complex (combinations of different types). Simple dunes are basic forms with the minimum number of slipfaces that define the geometric type. Compound dunes are large dunes on which smaller dunes of similar type and slipface orientation are superimposed. Complex dunes are combinations of two or more dune types. A crescentic dune with a star dune superimposed on its crest is the most common complex dune. Simple dunes represent a wind regime that has not changed in intensity or direction since the formation of the dune, while compound and complex dunes suggest that the intensity and direction of the wind has changed.

Dune movement
The sand mass of dunes can move either windward or leeward, depending on if the wind is making contact with the dune from below or above its apogee. If wind hits from above, the sand particles move leeward; the leeward flux of sand is greater than the windward flux. Conversely, if sand hits from below, sand particles move windward. Further, if the wind is carrying sand particles when it hits the dune, the dune's sand particles will saltate more than if the wind had hit the dune without carrying sand particles.

Coastal dunes

Coastal dunes form when wet sand is deposited along the coast and dries out and is blown along the beach. Dunes form where the beach is wide enough to allow for the accumulation of wind-blown sand, and where prevailing onshore winds tend to blow sand inland. The three key ingredients for coastal dune formation are a large sand supply, winds to move said sand supply, and a place for the sand supply to accumulate. Obstacles—for example, vegetation, pebbles and so on—tend to slow down the wind and lead to the deposition of sand grains. These small "incipient dunes or "shadow dunes" tend to grow in the vertical direction if the obstacle slowing the wind can also grow vertically (i.e., vegetation). Coastal dunes expand laterally as a result of lateral growth of coastal plants via seed or rhizome. Models of coastal dunes suggest that their final equilibrium height is related to the distance between the water line and where vegetation can grow. Coastal dunes can be classified by where they develop, or begin to take shape. Dunes are commonly grouped into either the Primary Dune Group or the Secondary Dune Group. Primary dunes gain most of their sand from the beach itself, while secondary dunes gain their sand from the primary dune. Along the Florida Panhandle, most dunes are considered to be foredunes or hummocks. Different locations around the globe have dune formations unique to their given coastal profile.

Coastal sand dunes can provide privacy and/or habitats to support local flora and fauna. Animals such as sand snakes, lizards, and rodents can live in coastal sand dunes, along with insects of all types. Often the vegetation of sand dunes is discussed without acknowledging the importance that coastal dunes have for animals. Further, some animals, such as foxes and feral pigs can use coastal dunes as hunting grounds to find food. Birds are also known to utilize coastal dunes as nesting grounds. All these species find the coastal environment of the sand dune vital to their species' survival.

Over the course of time coastal dunes may be impacted by tropical cyclones or other intense storm activity, dependent on their location. Recent work has suggested that coastal dunes tend to evolve toward a high or low morphology depending on the growth rate of dunes relative to storm frequency. During a storm event, dunes play a significant role in minimizing wave energy as it moves onshore. As a result, coastal dunes, especially those in the foredune area affected by a storm surge, will retreat or erode. To counteract the damage from tropical activity on coastal dunes, short term post-storm efforts can be made by individual agencies through fencing to help with sand accumulation.

How much a dune erodes during any storm surge is related to its location on the coastal shoreline and the profile of the beach during a particular season. In those areas with harsher winter weather, during the summer a beach tends to take on more of a convex appearance due to gentler waves, while the same beach in the winter may take on more of a concave appearance. As a result, coastal dunes can get eroded much more quickly in the winter than in the summer. The converse is true in areas with harsher summer weather.

There are many threats to these coastal communities. Some coastal dunes, for example ones in San Francisco, have been completely altered by urbanization; reshaping the dune for human use. This puts native species at risk. Another danger, in California and places in the UK specifically, is the introduction of invasive species. Plant species, such as Carpobrotus edulis, were introduced from South Africa in an attempt to stabilize the dunes and provide horticultural benefits, but instead spread taking land away from native species. Ammophila arenaria, known as European beachgrass, has a similar story, though it has no horticulture benefits. It has great ground coverage and, as intended, stabilized the dunes but as an unintended side effect prevented native species from thriving in those dunes. One such example is the dune field at Point Reyes, California. There are now efforts to get rid of both of these invasive species.

Ecological succession on coastal dunes
As a dune forms, plant succession occurs. The conditions on an embryo dune are harsh, with salt spray from the sea carried on strong winds. The dune is well drained and often dry, and composed of calcium carbonate from seashells. Rotting seaweed, brought in by storm waves adds nutrients to allow pioneer species to colonize the dune. For example, in the United Kingdom these pioneer species are often marram grass, sea wort grass and other sea grasses. These plants are well adapted to the harsh conditions of the foredune, typically having deep roots which reach the water table, root nodules that produce nitrogen compounds, and protected stoma, reducing transpiration. Also, the deep roots bind the sand together, and the dune grows into a foredune as more sand is blown over the grasses. The grasses add nitrogen to the soil, meaning other, less hardy plants can then colonize the dunes. Typically these are heather, heaths and gorses. These too are adapted to the low soil water content and have small, prickly leaves which reduce transpiration. Heather adds humus to the soil and is usually replaced by coniferous trees, which can tolerate low soil pH, caused by the accumulation and decomposition of organic matter with nitrate leaching. Coniferous forests and heathland are common climax communities for sand dune systems.

Young dunes are called yellow dunes and dunes which have high humus content are called grey dunes. Leaching occurs on the dunes, washing humus into the slacks, and the slacks may be much more developed than the exposed tops of the dunes. It is usually in the slacks that more rare species are developed and there is a tendency for the dune slacks' soil to be waterlogged where only marsh plants can survive. In Europe these plants include: creeping willow, cotton grass, yellow iris, reeds, and rushes. As for vertebrates in European dunes, natterjack toads sometimes breed here.

Coastal dune floral adaptations 

Dune ecosystems are extremely difficult places for plants to survive. This is due to a number of pressures related to their proximity to the ocean and confinement to growth on sandy substrates. These include:
 Little available soil moisture
 Little available soil organic matter/nutrients/water
 Harsh winds
 Salt spray
 Erosion/shifting and sometimes burial or exposure (from shifting)
 Tidal influences
Plants have evolved many adaptations to cope with these pressures:
 Deep taproot to reach water table (Pink Sand Verbena)
 Shallow but extensive root systems
Rhizomes
 Prostrate growth form to avoid wind/salt spray (Abronia spp., Beach Primrose)
 Krummholz growth form (Monterrey Cypress-not a dune plant but deals with similar pressures)
 Thickened cuticle/Succulence to reduce moisture loss and reduce salt uptake (Ambrosia/Abronia spp., Calystegia soldanella)
 Pale leaves to reduce insolation (Artemisia/Ambrosia spp.)
 Thorny/Spiky seeds to ensure establishment in vicinity of parent, reduces chances of being blown away or swept out to sea (Ambrosia chamissonis)

Gypsum dunes

In deserts where large amounts of limestone mountains surround a closed basin, such as at White Sands National Park in south-central New Mexico, occasional storm runoff transports dissolved limestone and gypsum into a low-lying pan within the basin where the water evaporates, depositing the gypsum and forming crystals known as selenite. The crystals left behind by this process are eroded by the wind and deposited as vast white dune fields that resemble snow-covered landscapes. These types of dune are rare, and only form in closed arid basins that retain the highly soluble gypsum that would otherwise be washed into the sea.

Nabkha dunes
A nabkha, or coppice dune, is a small dune anchored by vegetation. They usually indicate desertification or soil erosion, and serve as nesting and burrow sites for animals.

Sub-aqueous dunes

Sub-aqueous (underwater) dunes form on a bed of sand or gravel under the actions of water flow. They are ubiquitous in natural channels such as rivers and estuaries, and also form in engineered canals and pipelines. Dunes move downstream as the upstream slope is eroded and the sediment deposited on the downstream or lee slope in typical bedform construction. In the case of sub-aqueous barchan dunes, sediment is lost by their extremities, known as horns.

These dunes most often form as a continuous 'train' of dunes, showing remarkable similarity in wavelength and height. The shape of a dune gives information about its formation environment. For instance, rivers produce asymmetrical ripples, with the steeper slip face facing downstream. Ripple marks preserved in sedimentary strata in the geological record can be used to determine the direction of current flow, and thus an indication of the source of the sediments.

Dunes on the bed of a channel significantly increase flow resistance, their presence and growth playing a major part in river flooding.

Lithified dunes

A lithified (consolidated) sand dune is a type of sandstone that is formed when a marine or aeolian sand dune becomes compacted and hardened. Once in this form, water passing through the rock can carry and deposit minerals, which can alter the color of the rock. Cross-bedded layers of stacks of lithified dunes can produce the cross-hatching patterns, such as those seen in Zion National Park in the western United States.

A slang term, used in the southwest US, for consolidated and hardened sand dunes is "slickrock", a name that was introduced by pioneers of the Old West because their steel-rimmed wagon wheels could not gain traction on the rock.

Desertification

Sand dunes can have a negative impact on humans when they encroach on human habitats. Sand dunes move via a few different means, all of them helped along by wind. One way that dunes can move is by saltation, where sand particles skip along the ground like a bouncing ball. When these skipping particles land, they may knock into other particles and cause them to move as well, in a process known as creep. With slightly stronger winds, particles collide in mid-air, causing sheet flows. In a major dust storm, dunes may move tens of metres through such sheet flows. Also as in the case of snow, sand avalanches, falling down the slipface of the dunes—that face away from the winds—also move the dunes forward.

Sand threatens buildings and crops in Africa, the Middle East, and China. Drenching sand dunes with oil stops their migration, but this approach uses a valuable resource and is quite destructive to the dunes' animal habitats. Sand fences might also slow their movement to a crawl, but geologists are still analyzing results for the optimum fence designs. Preventing sand dunes from overwhelming towns, villages, and agricultural areas has become a priority for the United Nations Environment Programme. Planting dunes with vegetation also helps to stabilise them.

Conservation

Dune habitats provide niches for highly specialized plants and animals, including numerous rare species and some endangered species. Due to widespread human population expansion, dunes face destruction through land development and recreational usages, as well as alteration to prevent the encroachment of sand onto inhabited areas. Some countries, notably the United States, Australia, Canada, New Zealand, the United Kingdom, Netherlands, and Sri Lanka have developed significant programs of dune protection through the use of sand dune stabilization. In the U.K., a Biodiversity Action Plan has been developed to assess dunes loss and to prevent future dunes destruction.

Examples

Africa

 Alexandria Coastal Dunefields, in the Eastern Cape, South Africa
 Witsand Nature Reserve in the Kalahari Desert, South Africa
 The white dunes of De Hoop Nature Reserve, South Africa
 The dunes of the Suguta Valley, a desert part of the Great Rift Valley in northwestern Kenya
 The dunes of the Danakil Depression, northeastern Ethiopia toward the border with Eritrea
 The dunes of Sossusvlei in the greater Namib-Naukluft National Park, Namibia
 The coastal dunes of Iona National Park in the southwesternmost part of Angola
 Khawa dunes in the Kgalagadi Transfrontier Park, the southwesternmost part of Botswana
 La Dune Rose in the city of Gao in northern Mali near the Niger River
 Erg Aoukar in southeastern Mauritania extending into Mali 
 Erg Chech in southwestern Algeria and northern Mali
 Erg Chebbi and Erg Chigaga in southern Morocco
 Grand Erg Oriental in northeastern Algeria and southern Tunisia 
 Grand Erg Occidental in western Algeria 
 The Idehan Ubari and the Idehan Murzuq in southwestern Libya
 The Corralejo dunes in the Canary Islands, Spain
 The Rebiana Sand Sea in southeastern Libya
 The Great Sand Sea in southeastern Libya and southwestern Egypt
 The Selima Sand Sheet in northwestern Sudan
 The dunes of the Bayuda Desert in northern Sudan
 The dunes of the Lompoul Desert in northwestern Senegal
 The coastal dunes of Bazaruto Island, Mozambique
 Erg du Djourab in northern Chad
 The dunes of the Mourdi Depression in northeastern Chad
 The dunes of Tin Toumma Desert, in southeastern Niger
 Grand Erg de Bilma in the Ténéré, in northern Niger
 The dunes of Oursi in the Sahel Region, northern Burkina Faso
 Tanzania's Shifting Sands near Olduvai Gorge

Asia
 Sunset view dunes in the Alankuda village on Kalpitiya peninsula in Sri Lanka https://goo.gl/maps/Hy96XnvbkQBAB53F8
 The dunes in the Thar Desert in India and Pakistan
 Tottori Sand Dunes, Tottori Prefecture, Japan
 Rig-e Jenn in the Central Desert of Iran.
 Rig-e Lut in the Southeast of Iran.
 The Ilocos Norte Sand Dunes in the Philippines, particularly Paoay Sand Dunes.
 Moreeb Dune in Liwa Oasis, United Arab Emirates, used as an arena for drag motor sports and Sandboarding.
 Gumuk Pasir Parangkusumo near Parangtritis beach in Yogyakarta, Indonesia.
 Mui Ne, Vietnam.
 Wahiba Sands, Oman
 Teri, red dune complex in southern India
  The dunes of the Taklamakan Desert in southwest Xinjiang in Northwest China
Tukulans of the Central Yakutian Lowland, Russia

Europe

 The Dunes of Dyuni, near Pomorie, Bulgaria, vast area of sand dunes in the Burgas Province
 The Dune of Pilat, not far from Bordeaux, France, is the largest known sand dune in Europe
 The Dunes of Piscinas, in the south west of Sardinia island.
 Sands of Forvie within the Ythan Estuary complex, Aberdeenshire, Scotland.
 Oxwich Dunes, near Swansea, is on the Gower Peninsula in Wales.
 Winterton Dunes – Norfolk, England
 Słowiński National Park, Poland
Siedlec Desert, Poland
Starczynów Desert, now mostly forested dunes, Poland
 Sand dunes of Lemnos, Lesbos Prefecture, Greece
 Akrotiri Sand Dune, Lemesos, Cyprus
 Råbjerg mile, Northern Jutland, Denmark
 Thy National Park, North Denmark Region, Denmark
 Dunes of Corrubedo, Spain
 Cresmina Dune, Portugal
 Northern Littoral Natural Park, Portugal
 Dune of Salir, Portugal
 São Jacinto Dunes Natural Reserve, Portugal
 Rëra e Hedhur in Shëngjin, Albania
 De Hoge Veluwe National Park, Veluwe, Netherlands
 Kootwijkerzand, Veluwe, Netherlands, 7 km2
 Dunes of Texel National Park, Texel, Netherlands
 Zuid-Kennemerland National Park, North Holland, Netherlands
 Ammothines Lemnou, Lemnos, Greece
 Dunes of the Curonian Spit, Lithuania and Russia
Parnidis Dune, Vecekrugas Dune - Curonian Spit, Lithuania
 Oleshky Sands, Ukraine
 Ullahau, Sweden, Big Parabel Dune and dune system

North America

 Victoria Island Sand Dunes,160 km North West of Cambridge Bay, Nunavut, Canada. Approximately 600 square kilometers, the largest in Canada, third largest in North America and the largest in the Arctic. There are two lakes with direct access to the Dunes from float planes. 
Herring Cove, Race Point and The Province Lands bicycle path in Provincetown, Massachusetts as part of the US National Park Service of the Cape Cod National Seashore.
 Great Kobuk Sand Dunes, Kobuk Valley National Park, Alaska
 The Athabasca Sand Dunes, located in the Athabasca Sand Dunes Provincial Park, Saskatchewan.
 The Cadiz Dunes in the Mojave Trails National Monument in California.
 The Kelso Dunes in the Mojave Desert of California.
Eureka Valley Sand Dunes and Mesquite Flat Sand Dunes in Death Valley National Park, California.
Great Sand Dunes National Park, Colorado.
White Sands National Park, New Mexico.
Little Sahara Recreation Area, Utah.
Sleeping Bear Dunes National Lakeshore, Michigan, on the east shore of Lake Michigan.
Indiana Dunes National Park, Indiana, on the south shore of Lake Michigan.
Warren Dunes State Park, Michigan, on the east shore of Lake Michigan.
Grand Sable Dunes, in the Pictured Rocks National Lakeshore, Michigan.
Samalayuca Dunes, in the state of Chihuahua, Mexico
Algodones Dunes near Brawley, California.
Guadalupe-Nipomo Dunes, on the central coast of California.
Monahans Sandhills State Park near Odessa, Texas.
Beaver Dunes State Park near Beaver, Oklahoma.
 The Killpecker sand dunes of the Red Desert in southwestern Wyoming.
Jockey's Ridge State Park – on the Outer Banks, North Carolina.
 The Great Dune found in Cape Henlopen State Park in Lewes, Delaware.
Oregon Dunes National Recreation Area near Florence, Oregon, on the Pacific Coast.
Bruneau Dunes State Park – Owyhee Desert, Idaho
Hoffmaster State Park – Muskegon, Michigan
Silver Lake State Park — a sand dunes that allows off-road vehicle use located near Mears, Michigan.
Carcross Desert near Carcross, Yukon

South America

 Lençóis Maranhenses National Park in the state of Maranhão, Brazil
 Jericoacoara National Park, in the state of Ceará, Brazil
 Genipabu in Natal, Brazil
 Medanos de Coro National Park near the town of Coro, in Falcón State, Venezuela
 Duna Federico Kirbus in Catamarca Province, Argentina
 Villa Gesell in Buenos Aires Province, Argentina
 Cerro Blanco in Nazca Province, Peru
 Huacachina in Ica Region, Peru
 Cerro Medanoso in Atacama Region, Chile
 Colún Beach, Valdivian Coastal Reserve in Chile
 :es:Dunas de Concón, Chile
 :es:Cerro Dragón (Chile), urban dune in Iquique, Chile

Oceania
 Simpson Desert sand dunes in the Northern Territory, Queensland and South Australia, Australia
 Fraser Island in Queensland, Australia
 Cronulla sand dunes in New South Wales, Australia
 Stockton Beach in New South Wales, Australia
 Lancelin sand dunes in Western Australia, Australia
 Te Paki sand dunes near Cape Reinga, New Zealand

World's highest dunes

Sand dune systems
(coastal dunes featuring succession)
 Athabasca Sand Dunes Provincial Park, Alberta and Saskatchewan
 Ashdod Sand Dune, Israel
 Bamburgh Dunes, Northumberland, England
 Bradley Beach, New Jersey
 Circeo National Park, a Mediterranean dune area on the southwest coast of the Lazio region of Italy
 Cronulla sand dunes, NSW, Australia
 Crymlyn Burrows, Wales
 Dawlish Warren, Devon, England
 Fraser Island, Queensland Australia, largest sand island in the world
 Indiana Dunes National Park, Indiana
 Kenfig Burrows, Wales
 Margam burrows, Wales
 Murlough Sand Dunes, Newcastle, Co Down, Northern Ireland
 Morfa Harlech sand dunes, Gwynedd, Wales
 Newborough Warren, North Wales
 Oregon Dunes National Recreation Area, near North Bend, Oregon
 Penhale Sands, Cornwall, England
 Sleeping Bear Dunes National Lakeshore, Michigan
 Sandy Island Beach State Park, Richland, New York
 Studland, Dorset, England
 Thy National Park, North Denmark Region, Denmark
 Winterton, Norfolk, England
 Woolacombe, Devon, England
 Ynyslas Sand Dunes, Wales

Extraterrestrial dunes

Dunes can likely be found in any environment where there is a substantial atmosphere, winds, and dust to be blown. Dunes are common on Mars and in the equatorial regions of Titan.

Titan's dunes include large expanses with modal lengths of about 20–30 km. The regions are not topographically confined, resembling sand seas. These dunes are interpreted to be longitudinal dunes whose crests are oriented parallel to the dominant wind direction, which generally indicates west-to-east wind flow. The sand is likely composed of hydrocarbon particles, possibly with some water ice mixed in.

Dunes are a popular theme in science fiction, featuring in depictions of dry Desert planets appearing as early as the 1956 film Forbidden Planet and Frank Herbert's 1965 novel Dune. The environment of the desert planet Arrakis (also known as Dune) in the Dune franchise Dune in turn inspired the Star Wars franchise, which includes prominent theme of dunes on fictional planets such as Tatooine, Geonosis, and Jakku.

See also

 Antidune
 Devil's stovepipe
 Ice dune
 List of landforms
 Masseira
 Médanos
 Sandhill
 Sand wave
 Singing sand
 Strand plain

Notes

References

Further reading

External links

Loibor Seder Kenya's Biggest Sand Dune
Coastal Sand Dunes
Dune pattern identification, U.S. Army

 
Aeolian landforms
Coastal and oceanic landforms
Coastal geography
Sedimentology